Vendays-Montalivet is a commune in the Gironde department in the Nouvelle-Aquitaine region in Southwestern France. In 2019, it had a population of 2,410.

Climate

Demographics

See also
Communes of the Gironde department

References

Communes of Gironde